Bernard Weinraub (born December 19, 1937) is an American journalist and playwright.

Early life and education
Weinraub was born in 1937 in New York City. His parents were Jewish immigrants from Eastern Europe. He graduated from the City University of New York with a Bachelor of Arts degree in English.

Career
After graduating from college, he was drafted into the Army and served for two years on a newspaper. For most of his career he worked as a foreign correspondent with the New York Times including home bases in Saigon, London, Nairobi and New Delhi. He also covered the White House and the movie business in Los Angeles.

Journalism
He worked as a reporter for The New York Times. He started as a copyboy in his twenties, eventually being assigned as a foreign correspondent in Saigon, London, Belfast, Nairobi, New Delhi, then Washington, D.C. and Los Angeles. From 1991 to 2004, he covered the film industry in Los Angeles.

He retired in 2005, publishing an article about Hollywood and its values.

Theatre

The Accomplices
As a playwright, he published his first play, The Accomplices, in 2007. It  dealt with the refusal of President Franklin D. Roosevelt's administration to admit more Jews during The Holocaust in World War II. The play was performed both in New York and Los Angeles, and was nominated for a Drama Desk Award. Los Angeles Times critic Charles McNulty said that "no one gets off the hook" in the play, including Weinraub's former employer The New York Times, except for Eleanor Roosevelt. He commended Weinraub's journalism skills but faulted "the phony telegraphic manner in which it’s dramatized."

In the Times, which was negatively mentioned in the play, critic David Ng  faulted Accomplices as "a mind-numbing history lesson" and a "soporific lecture of a play."

Above the Fold
His second play, out in 2014, was Above the Fold. Based on the Duke lacrosse case, it shows the struggles of an African American journalist who realizes the scandal is phony while covering it. It premiered at the Pasadena Playhouse in Pasadena, California. It was directed by Steven Robman and the lead actress was Taraji P. Henson.

Personal life
He has been married twice. He has two children, son Jesse Nicholas and daughter Claire from his first marriage to Judith Weinraub. He met Amy Pascal, a film industry executive, at The Peninsula Beverly Hills in 1996; they got married in 1997. They reside in Brentwood, a Western suburb of Los Angeles, California,  with their son Anthony.

Bibliography
Bylines (Doubleday, 1982).

References

1939 births
Living people
Journalists from New York City
People from Brentwood, Los Angeles
City University of New York alumni
American war correspondents of the Vietnam War
American male journalists
The New York Times writers
People involved in plagiarism controversies
20th-century American dramatists and playwrights
Jewish American journalists
American male dramatists and playwrights
Journalists from California
United States Army soldiers
20th-century American male writers
21st-century American Jews